Love's Deadly Triangle: The Texas Cadet Murder (DVD title: Swearing Allegiance) is a 1997 American made-for-television drama film based on the real life murder of Adrianne Jones by Diane Zamora in Texas. The film stars Holly Marie Combs (as Zamora), David Lipper, Cassidy Rae (as Jones), Dee Wallace, Gary Grubbs, Kurt Fuller, and Joanna Garcia. The film was adapted from "The Killer Cadets", an article in Texas Monthly by Skip Hollandsworth, and aired on NBC on February 10, 1997.

Plot 
The story of the real-life case of David Graham and Diane Zamora. It revolves around two best friends who turn out to be soul mates and who swear to stay together forever and ever, even to the point where Graham's apparently confessed infidelity leads to the couple's murder of the girl with whom he purportedly cheated.

Cast 
 Holly Marie Combs as Diane Zamora 
 David Lipper as David Graham 
 Cassidy Rae as Adrianne Jones 
 Dee Wallace as Mrs. Jones
 Wilmer Calderon as Perry

Controversy 
The film was broadcast prior to trial, which raised the objections of the lawyers for the defendants, as they were concerned that it may prevent the defendants from receiving a fair trial. The parents of the victim also raised objections about the film.

References

External links 
 
 
 "The Killer Cadets." Texas Monthly, December 1996. Hollandsworth, Skip.

1998 television films
1998 films
1990s crime drama films
American crime drama films
1990s English-language films
Films set in 1995
Films set in Texas
Crime films based on actual events
NBC network original films
Films directed by Richard A. Colla
Films scored by Dennis McCarthy
American drama television films
1990s American films